The Wheeler Baronetcy, of Woodhouse Eaves in the County of Leicester, is a title in the Baronetage of the United Kingdom. It was created on 7 February 1920 for the stockbroker and financier Arthur Wheeler.

Wheeler baronets, of Woodhouse Eaves (1920)
Sir Arthur Wheeler, 1st Baronet (1860–1943)
Sir Arthur Frederick Pullman Wheeler, 2nd Baronet (1900–1964)
Sir John Hieron Wheeler, 3rd Baronet (1905–2005)
Sir John Frederick Wheeler, 4th Baronet (born 1933)

References
Kidd, Charles, Williamson, David (editors). Debrett's Peerage and Baronetage (1990 edition). New York: St Martin's Press, 1990.

Wheeler